The Sulawesi myzomela (Myzomela chloroptera) is a species of bird in the family Meliphagidae. It is endemic to Indonesia where it occurs in Sulawesi, Taliabu, Selayar and Tanah Jampea. Its natural habitats are subtropical or tropical moist lowland forests, subtropical or tropical mangrove forests, and subtropical or tropical moist montane forests.

References

Myzomela
Endemic birds of Sulawesi
Birds described in 1872
Taxonomy articles created by Polbot